Liberto is both a given name and a surname of Italian origin.

Etymology
In ancient Greece, those freed slaves had various kinds of obligations toward their former owners and they did not have full citizens rights.

In ancient Rome they were called , a freedman (feminine: liberta) or an emancipated person who acts for and on behalf of its former master, who became his patron.

However, the name Liberto has also been traced to an unrelated Germanic given name.

Notable people

Notable people with the surname include American homemaker Vivian Liberto, who was the first wife of country singer-songwriter Johnny Cash, and the mother of singer-songwriter Rosanne Cash.  Its derivative form Diliberto includes Italian politician Oliviero Diliberto.

Notable people with the given name include Liberto Corney, an Uruguayan boxer who competed in the 1924 Summer Olympics, and Liberto dos Santos, a Portuguese footballer who played as forward.

See also
Roman law
Slavery in ancient Greece
Slavery in ancient Rome

References

External links

Italian masculine given names
Portuguese masculine given names
Spanish masculine given names
Italian-language surnames